Brian David Barden (born April 2, 1981) is an American former professional baseball infielder. He played for the Arizona Diamondbacks, St. Louis Cardinals, and Florida Marlins of Major League Baseball (MLB), and for the Hiroshima Toyo Carp of Nippon Professional Baseball (NPB).

Early life
Barden went to St. Pius X Elementary School and attended St. Augustine High School in San Diego's North Park neighborhood and Oregon State University. In 2001, he played collegiate summer baseball with the Brewster Whitecaps of the Cape Cod Baseball League.

Professional career

Arizona Diamondbacks
Barden was drafted by the Arizona Diamondbacks in the sixth round of the 2002 Major League Baseball Draft.  He made his major league debut with the Diamondbacks on April 3, 2007, against the Colorado Rockies, grounding out as a pinch hitter. His first hit was a single to center field off Shawn Hill of the Washington Nationals on April 8. That was his only hit in 6 at-bats for the Diamondbacks in the 8 games he played for them in 2007, with the rest of his time being spent with the AAA Tucson Sidewinders.

St. Louis Cardinals
He was selected off waivers by St. Louis Cardinals on August 13, 2007.

Barden was batting .295 with nine home runs and 35 RBI for the Cardinals' Triple-A Pacific Coast League affiliate, the Memphis Redbirds, when his season was ended as the result of being named to the  USA Olympic Baseball Team.

On May 5, 2009, he was named NL Rookie of the Month for April.

Florida Marlins
On December 14, 2009, Barden signed a minor league contract with the Florida Marlins. He was added to the Major League roster on April 3, but designated for assignment on July 3, 2010.

Texas Rangers
For the 2011 season, he signed a minor league contract with the Texas Rangers and played for the AAA Round Rock Express before opting out on July 1.

Hiroshima Toyo Carp
Brian signed a 1-year contract with the Hiroshima Toyo Carp of Nippon Professional Baseball on July 18, 2011. He played in 64 games and hit .281.

Los Angeles Dodgers
He signed a minor league contract with the Los Angeles Dodgers on January 5, 2013,  and was assigned to the AAA Albuquerque Isotopes. He played in 123 games and hit .277, while playing primarily third base.

Piratas de Campeche
On April 1, 2014, Barden signed with the Piratas de Campeche of the Mexican Baseball League. He was released on April 14, 2014.

Leones de Yucatan
On March 31, 2014, Barden signed with the Leones de Yucatan of the Mexican Baseball League. He was released on May 29, 2014.

Somerset Patriots
On June 10, 2014, Barden signed with the Somerset Patriots of the Atlantic League of Professional Baseball. He became a free agent after the 2014 season.

References

External links

1981 births
Albuquerque Isotopes players
American expatriate baseball players in Japan
American expatriate baseball players in Mexico
Arizona Diamondbacks players
Baseball players at the 2008 Summer Olympics
Baseball players from California
Brewster Whitecaps players
El Paso Diablos players
Hiroshima Toyo Carp players
Lancaster JetHawks players
Leones de Yucatán players
Living people
Major League Baseball infielders
Medalists at the 2008 Summer Olympics
Memphis Redbirds players
Mexican League baseball third basemen
New Orleans Zephyrs players
Nippon Professional Baseball first basemen
Nippon Professional Baseball third basemen
Olympic bronze medalists for the United States in baseball
Oregon State Beavers baseball players
Piratas de Campeche players
Round Rock Express players
Somerset Patriots players
Sportspeople from Chula Vista, California
St. Louis Cardinals players
Tucson Sidewinders players
Yakima Bears players